Return To Zooathlon is the ninth studio album by Sananda Maitreya (formerly Terence Trent D'Arby). It was released on March 1, 2013 via Treehouse Publishing label. It is available as MP3 files and on CD format, from his on-line web store.

Track listing
”Brimstone Follies” - 0:59
”DFM (Don't Follow Me)” - 3:21
”Save Me” - 3:23
”Dancing With Mr. Nostalgia” - 3:19
”Stagger Lee - Part 1” - 1:44
”Stagger Lee - Part 2” - 2:30
”Ornella Or Nothing” - 3:38
”Where Do Teardrops Fall?” - 4:29
”Albuquerque” - 3:21
”Camel” - 3:14
”Mr. Gruberschnickel” - 3:37
”Just Go Easy” - 4:23
”Tequila Mockingbird” - 3:25
”She's Not Right” - 2:44
”Return To Zooathalon” - 4:07
”Walk Away” - Ghost Song” - 3:02
”Hurricane Me & You” - 4:58
”If I Go Away” - 3:49 
”Free To Be” - 4:44
”Kangaroo” - 3:55
”D.H.S.” - 0:36
”The Last Train To Houston” - 5:24

References

External links
 

2013 albums
Terence Trent D'Arby albums